Ruthalicia is a genus of flowering plants belonging to the family Cucurbitaceae.

Its native range is Western and Western Central Tropical Africa.

Species:

Ruthalicia eglandulosa 
Ruthalicia longipes

References

Cucurbitaceae
Cucurbitaceae genera